Locharna strigipennis is a moth in the family Erebidae first described by Frederic Moore in 1879. It is found in the north-eastern Himalaya, India, China and Taiwan.

The wingspan is 40–47 mm.

References
 Original description: 

Moths described in 1879
Lymantriinae